Sharif Uddin Ahmed was a Bangladesh Awami League politician and the former Member of Parliament of Habiganj-2.

Career
Sharif Uddin Ahmed was elected to parliament from Habiganj-2 as a Bangladesh Awami League candidate in 1991 and 1996. He was  the president of Habiganj District Awamileage at the time of his death. He was first elected as the party's secretary in 1985.

Birth
He was born in Baniachong.

Death
Ahmed died on 6 August 1996. Few days before his death he had brought an emergency notice to the parliament to build road from Baniachong to Ajmerigonj. When he died the Parliament members decided to name that road after him and it was approved by all the parties which was a rare occurrence in Bangladeshi politics. First person to propose that was General Ershad from Jatiya Party.

References

Awami League politicians
1997 deaths
5th Jatiya Sangsad members
7th Jatiya Sangsad members